Sukekiyo (stylized as sukekiyo and also referred to in katakana form as ) is a Japanese band formed in 2013 by Dir En Grey vocalist Kyo. It is sometimes referred to as a supergroup as every member of the band is or has been in other well-known acts in the Japanese visual kei movement, although only Kyo is currently active in another band.

History
Sukekiyo was formed as a side project by Kyo along with members of other Japanese rock bands. The name derives from Seishi Yokomizo's novel The Inugami Clan. The band's activities are by periods as Kyo's main project Dir en grey is still his priority. Since the band released their first album, they have had a handful of tours in Japan, and more recently, Europe.

In November 2014, they announced a new mini-album called Vitium, which contained 8 new tracks and released on February 4, 2015. The limited edition came with a second disc that includes collaborations with other artists such as X Japan vocalist Toshi and actor Hiroshi Mikami.

On June 21, 2017, Sukekiyo released their second full-length studio album, Adoratio. They covered "Gerbera" for the November 22 Mucc tribute album Tribute of Mucc -En-.

Members
: vocals, programming (Dir en grey, Petit Brabancon)
: guitar, piano (formerly of Rentrer en Soi, Dir en grey support member) 
Uta: guitar (formerly of 9Goats Black Out) 
: bass (formerly of Kannivalism, Wing Works)
: drums (formerly of Rentrer en Soi, Forbidden Days Rhapsody)

Discography
Albums
Immortalis (2014)
Adoratio (2017)
Infinitum (2019)
EPs
The Daemon's Cutlery (2013)
Vitium (2015)
Singles
"The Daemon's Cutlery" (2014)
"2014 live: 'wakare wo oshimu furi wa anata no tame'" (2014)
"Mimi Zozo" (2015)
"Anima" (2016)
"Aoguroi Hysteria" (2017)
"KISSES" (2018)
"SALUS" (2021)
Demo Tapes
"Koumo chigau mono nanoka, yosuruni (1 Shot Analog Recording -Demo Ver. 20171121-)" (2018)
"Sesshoku" (2020)
"furesaseru" (2021)
"Valentina" (2021)
"Yumemi Doro" (2021)
"Aishita Shinzo" (2021)
Live Albums
Persuasio (2015)
Mutans (2016)
PASSIO (2019)
Liquefacio (2020)
Luxuria (2021)

Videoclip
Their first video for the song "Aftermath" was released on January 1, 2014 through iTunes. which appears on their first album Immortalis. A second video for the song "In All Weathers" was released on the bonus Blu-ray Disc along with "Aftermath".

List of Video Clips:
"Aftermath" (2014)
"In All Weathers" (2014)
"Ameagari no Yūshi" (2015)
"focus" (2015)
"Anima" (2016)
"Jūniji Nijuppun Konrinzai" (2016)
"En" (2017)
"Hidauta" (2017)
"Waizatsu" (2019)
"Tada, Mada, Watashi." (2019)
"Candis" (2021)
"Candis (Another Edition)" (2021)

References

2013 establishments in Japan
Japanese alternative rock groups
Japanese progressive rock groups
Musical groups established in 2013
Musical quintets
Supergroups (music)
Visual kei musical groups
Japanese experimental musical groups